Skaidrīte Smildziņa-Budovska (born 2 March 1943 in Riga) is a retired Latvian basketball player. She spent all her career in TTT Riga (captain from 1963 till 1969). Smildziņa-Budovska played for Latvian SSR and Soviet Union national basketball team.

Smildziņa-Budovska won 11 FIBA Women's European Champions Cups (1960–1962, 1964–1969, 1971–1972) with TTT Riga, 3 World Championships (1959, 1964, 1967) and 5 European Championships (1960, 1962, 1964, 1966, 1968) with the Soviet Union national team.

References

External links 
 Biography 

1943 births
Living people
Basketball players from Riga
Latvian women's basketball players
Riga Technical University alumni
Soviet women's basketball players
Centers (basketball)